A people's court in the late Soviet Union was a court of first instance which handled the majority of civil and criminal offenses, as well as certain administrative law offenses.

The people's court handled cases by a collegium consisted of a people's judge and two people's assessors. The people's assessors had duties similar to jurors, but decided both any objections and the verdict along with the judge, unlike in most jury systems.

In early Soviet Russia and Soviet Union the term "people's court" was used in reference to any court in the new Soviet legal system which replaced the legal system of the Russian Empire. At these times there were several levels of courts, according to the administrative division of the country: local, okrug, and oblast people's courts.

See also
 Procurator General of the USSR
 Supreme Court of the USSR
 Ministry of Justice of the USSR

References

Soviet law
Defunct courts